The 1988 Quebec Esso Cup was an international under-17 ice hockey tournament held in Quebec, Canada.  It was the second installment of what is now known as the World U-17 Hockey Challenge.  The USSR, led by Pavel Bure, took their first ever gold medal in the tournament, while the Swedish team featuring Mats Sundin won the silver.  The hosts Canada Quebec won their second consecutive medal in the tournament with the bronze.

Challenge results

See also
 1988 World Junior Ice Hockey Championships

References
World U17 Hockey Challenge - Event History (Archived 2009-06-25)

External links
World U17 Hockey Challenge on HockeyCanada.ca

1988
1987–88 in Canadian ice hockey
1987–88 in Soviet ice hockey
1987–88 in Swedish ice hockey
Ice hockey in Quebec
International ice hockey competitions hosted by Canada